Camille N. Drie, also known as Camille N. Dry, was a draughtsman active  from ca. 1871 to 1904 in the United States. Drie created pictorial maps of various cities including a 110-sheet view of St. Louis, Missouri (1875). The Library of Congress has a collection of his work.

Drie also produced pictorial maps of Galveston, Texas; Anniston, Alabama, and Vicksburg, Mississippi.

He worked with Richard J. Compton on the St. Louis mapping project.

See also
Herman Brosius

References

American draughtsmen
Year of birth missing
Year of death missing